Neck and Neck is a 1931 American drama film directed by Richard Thorpe from a script by Betty Burbridge and starring Glenn Tryon, Vera Reynolds and Walter Brennan.

Cast 
Glenn Tryon as Bill Grant
Vera Reynolds as Norma Rickson
Walter Brennan as Hector
Lafe McKee as Colonel Rickson
Carroll Nye as Frank Douglas
Stepin Fetchit as The hustler
Lloyd Whitlock as Bookie
Fern Emmett as Aunt Susan
Rosita Butler as Crystal

References

Bibliography
 Pitts, Michael R. Poverty Row Studios, 1929-1940. McFarland & Company, 2005.

External links 

1931 films
1931 drama films
American black-and-white films
American drama films
1930s English-language films
Films directed by Richard Thorpe
1930s American films